The 1956 NBA draft was the tenth annual draft of the National Basketball Association (NBA). The draft was held on April 30, 1956, before the 1956–57 season. In this draft, eight NBA teams took turns selecting amateur U.S. college basketball players. In each round, the teams select in reverse order of their win–loss record in the previous season, except for the defending champion and runner-up, who were assigned the last two picks on each round. The draft consisted of 10 rounds comprising 92 players selected.

Draft selections and draftee career notes
Si Green from Duquesne University was selected first overall by the Rochester Royals. Tom Heinsohn from the College of the Holy Cross was selected before the draft as Boston Celtics' territorial pick. Heinsohn went on to win the Rookie of the Year Award in his first season. Bill Russell from the University of San Francisco was selected second overall by the St. Louis Hawks and immediately traded to the Boston Celtics for Ed Macauley and Cliff Hagan. Three players from this draft, Tom Heinsohn, Bill Russell, and K. C. Jones, have been inducted to the Basketball Hall of Fame after championship careers with the Boston Celtics. Elgin Baylor and Sam Jones, who were selected by the Minneapolis Lakers in the later rounds, have also been inducted to the Basketball Hall of Fame, although they did not enter the league immediately after the draft. In the 1957 draft, Sam Jones was selected in the first round by the Boston Celtics, with whom he played for in his whole career. In the 1958 draft, Elgin Baylor was selected first overall by the Lakers, with whom he played for in his whole career.

Draft

Other picks
The following list includes other draft picks who have appeared in at least one NBA game.

Notable undrafted players
These players were not selected in the 1956 draft but played at least one game in the NBA.

Trades
 On draft-day, the Boston Celtics acquired the draft rights to second pick Bill Russell from the St. Louis Hawks in exchange for Ed Macauley and Cliff Hagan.
 On draft-day, the New York Knicks acquired the draft rights to sixth pick Ron Sobieszczyk from the Fort Wayne Pistons in exchange for Gene Shue.
 Baylor would not play for the Minneapolis Lakers until he was drafted by them again 1st overall in the 1958 NBA draft.

See also
 List of first overall NBA draft picks

References
General

Specific

External links
NBA.com
NBA.com: NBA Draft History

Draft
National Basketball Association draft
NBA draft
NBA draft
Basketball in New York City
Sporting events in New York City